Brownjohn is a surname. Notable people with the surname include:

Alan Brownjohn (born 1931), English poet and novelist
John Brownjohn (1929–2020), British literary translator
Nevil Brownjohn (1897–1973), British Army general
Robert Brownjohn (1925–1970), American graphic designer